Divita Rai (Tulu: ದಿವಿತ ರೈ); (born 10 January 1998) is an Indian model and beauty pageant titleholder who was crowned Miss Universe India on 28 August 2022 in Mumbai by outgoing Miss Universe 2021 Harnaaz Sandhu, and represented India at Miss Universe 2022, held on 14 January 2023. She placed in the top 16, being one of two Asians to qualify for the semi-finals by the selection committee. The other being Laos.

Pageantry 
In 2021, she competed in Miss Diva 2021 and finished as the 2nd runner-up to Miss Universe 2021, Harnaaz Sandhu. She also won the subcontest titles of Miss IQ, Miss Lifestyle, and Miss Sudoku during the pageant. Rai was crowned Miss Diva Universe 2022 on 28 August 2022 by the outgoing titleholder, Harnaaz Sandhu at the Miss Diva Organization's 10th anniversary gala. More than 30 former beauty pageant winners who represented India internationally attended the occasion.

Miss Universe 2022 

Rai represented India at the Miss Universe 2022 pageant, which took place on 14 January 2023 at the New Orleans Morial Convention Center in New Orleans, Louisiana, United States. She was in the top 16 semi-finalists.

References 

1998 births
Living people
People from Mangalore
Female models from Karnataka
Indian beauty pageant winners
Miss Universe 2022 contestants
University of Mumbai alumni